Delhi Sadar Lok Sabha constituency was one of the Lok Sabha (parliamentary) constituencies in the National Capital Territory of Delhi from 1956-2008.

Assembly segments
From 1966-93, Delhi Sadar Lok Sabha constituency comprised the following Delhi Metropolitan Council segments:
 Moti Nagar
 Kamla Nagar
 Vijay Nagar
 Model Town
 Deputy Ganj
 Sohan Ganj
 Shakti Nagar
 Karampura

From 1993-2008, it comprised the following Delhi Vidhan Sabha segments:
 Timarpur (Polling stations 1-45, 47-96)
 Model Town (Polling stations 1-102)
 Kamla Nagar
 Sadar Bazar
 Moti Nagar (Polling stations 1-106, 110-117)

Members of Lok Sabha

Election Result

1967 Lok Sabha Elections
 Kanwar Lal Gupta (Bharatiya Jana Sangh) : 73,801 votes 
 Amar Nath Chawla (INC) : 64,096 votes

1971 Lok Sabha Elections
 Amar Nath Chawla (INC) : 98,108 votes    
 Kanwar Lal Gupta (Bharatiya Jana Sangh) : 55305

2004 Lok Sabha Elections
 Jagdish Tytler (In) : 140,073 votes
 Vijay Goel (BJP) : 124,099

See also
 List of former constituencies of the Lok Sabha
 Delhi City (Lok Sabha constituency)
 North East Delhi (Lok Sabha constituency)

References

1956 establishments in Delhi
Constituencies established in 1956
Former Lok Sabha constituencies of Delhi
Former constituencies of the Lok Sabha
2008 disestablishments in India
Constituencies disestablished in 2008